Xingyi  is a town situated in Dingzhou, Baoding, Hebei, China.

See also
List of township-level divisions of Hebei

References

Township-level divisions of Hebei
Dingzhou